Hassanally A Rahman was born in Karachi, Sindh (1909 to 1986), to a prominent and respectable family of legal professionals, government officers, and people actively involved in the education sector. His father was the late and influential Karachi citizen, Barrister Abdurrahman. He received his barrister-at-law from Middle Temple, England in 1934. He was one of the founding architects along with his younger brother Tufail Ali Abdul Rehman of the Sindh Muslim Government Law College in Karachi. He also served as the first principal of the college. Known as a social and community leader, Mr. Hassnally A. Rahman was the vice chancellor of Sindh University, Jamshoro, where he served twice in the same capacity.

He was the treasurer of the Pakistan Institute of International Affairs, Secretary General of All Pakistan Educational Society, and President/Board Member Sindh Muslim Law College (S.M. Law College). In 1952, he led the Pakistani delegation to UNESCO and in 1953, represented the country at the Commonwealth University Conference.

Hassanally A. Rahman was the older brother of Justice Tufail Ali Abdul Rehman one of the top most lawyers practicing criminal law in Pakistan, who also served as Attorney General of Pakistan and the Chief Justice of Sindh and Balochistan High Courts. Justice Tufail Ali Abdul Rehman was also the presiding judge who sat on the Hamoodur Rahman commission post 1971 civil war between then West Pakistan (present-day Pakistan) and East Pakistan (present-day Bangladesh).

The two brothers were the only founding members of the Sindh Muslim Law College. Hassanally Rahman’s father Barrister Abdul Rahman was a famous barrister-at-law of the Subcontinent and was affiliated with the prestigious Queens Council.

In addition, the late Hassanally A. Rahman was involved in numerous other projects – from being active in the Pakistan Movement to serving as one of the founding members of Karachi University.

Mr. Hassanally Rahman was succeeded by five daughters, all of whom in their own right have earned respect both in Sindh, Pakistan, and the world-at-large.

Career
Hassanally became a barrister and was also politically active in the British Raj. He along with other fellow barristers worked with Muhammed Ali Jinnah, the founder of Pakistan.

References

1909 births
1986 deaths
20th-century Pakistani lawyers
People from Karachi
Sindh Muslim Law College alumni